Skynet may refer to:

Airlines
 Sky Net Airline, a charter airline from Armenia
 Skynet (airline), a Russian regional airline based at the Krasnoyarsk Airport
 Skynet Airlines, a defunct Irish airline that operated in 2001–2004
 Skynet, a domestic airmail network run by Royal Mail
 Solaseed Air, a low-cost Japanese airline previously known as Skynet Asia Airways

Communications
 Copyright (Infringing File Sharing) Amendment Act 2011, which repeals a section of the New Zealand Copyright Act which would have required ISPs to disconnect subscribers suspected of repeat copyright infringement
 Sky Net, a direct-to-home (DTH) TV broadcasting company in Myanmar
 Sky Television (New Zealand), a pay television service also referred to as Sky Network Television
 Proximus Skynet, a Belgian interactive digital media company 
 Skynet (satellite), a UK military communications system
 Skynet 5A
 Skynet 5B
 Skynet 5D
 Loral Skynet, American satellite operator, merged with Telesat Canada in 2007

Surveillance
 SKYNET (surveillance program), a program by the U.S. National Security Agency
 Operation Sky Net, the Chinese government's video mass surveillance system

Terminator franchise
 Skynet (Terminator), a fictional computer network, the primary antagonist in the Terminator franchise
 Skynet (video game), a 1996 PC game based on the Terminator film series

Other
 Skynet, a 1998 album by Juan Atkins under the Infiniti alias
 theSkyNet, an astronomy research project
 Skynet, the artificial intelligence found in the game Fallout 2

See also 
 
 Sky (disambiguation)
 Net (disambiguation)
 Sky Television (disambiguation), including TV networks named Sky
 Sky Network (disambiguation)